Alan Jay Perlis (April 1, 1922 – February 7, 1990) was an American computer scientist and professor at Purdue University, Carnegie Mellon University and Yale University. He is best known for his pioneering work in programming languages and was the first recipient of the Turing Award.

Biography
Perlis was born to a Jewish family in Pittsburgh, Pennsylvania. He graduated from Taylor Allderdice High School in 1939. In 1943, he received his bachelor's degree in chemistry from the Carnegie Institute of Technology (later renamed Carnegie Mellon University).

During World War II, he served in the U.S. Army, where he became interested in mathematics. He then earned both a master's degree (1949) and a Ph.D. (1950) in mathematics at Massachusetts Institute of Technology (MIT). His doctoral dissertation was titled "On Integral Equations, Their Solution by Iteration and Analytic Continuation".

In 1952, he participated in Project Whirlwind. He joined the faculty at Purdue University and in 1956, moved to the Carnegie Institute of Technology. He was chair of mathematics and then the first head of the computer science department. In 1962, he was elected president of the Association for Computing Machinery.

He was awarded the inaugural Turing Award in 1966, according to the citation, "for his influence in the area of advanced programming techniques and compiler construction." This is a reference to the work he had done on Internal Translator in 1956 (described by Donald Knuth as the first successful compiler), and as a member of the team that developed the programming language ALGOL.

In 1971, Perlis moved to Yale University to take the chair of computer science and hold the Eugene Higgins chair. In 1977, he was elected to the National Academy of Engineering.

In 1982, he wrote an article, "Epigrams on Programming", for the Association for Computing Machinery's (ACM) SIGPLAN journal, describing in one-sentence distillations many of the things he had learned about programming over his career. The epigrams have been widely quoted.
He remained at Yale until his death in 1990.

Publications 
Publications, a selection:
 1957. Internal Translator (IT): A Compiler for the 650. With  J. W. Smith and H. R. Van Zoeren.
  
 1965. An introductory course in computer programming. With Robert T. Braden.
 1970. A view of programming languages. With Bernard A. Galler
 1975. Introduction to computer science
 1977. In Praise of APL: A Language for Lyrical Programming
 1978. Almost Perfect Artifacts Improve only in Small Ways: APL is more French than English
 1981. Software Metrics: An Analysis and Evaluation. With Frederick Sayward and Mary Shaw
 1986. FAC: A Functional APL Language. With Tu Hai-Chen.

About Alan Perlis

See also
 List of pioneers in computer science

References

External links

 Oral history interview with Allen Newell at Charles Babbage Institute, University of Minnesota, Minneapolis.  Newell discusses the development of the Computer Science Department at Carnegie Mellon University, including the work of Perlis and Raj Reddy, and the growth of the computer science and artificial intelligence research communities.
 Alan J. Perlis Papers, 1942–1989. Charles Babbage Institute, University of Minnesota, Minneapolis

Jewish American military personnel
1922 births
1990 deaths
American computer scientists
Carnegie Mellon University alumni
Carnegie Mellon University faculty
Scientists from Pittsburgh
Presidents of the Association for Computing Machinery
Programming language designers
Turing Award laureates
Yale University faculty
United States Army soldiers
United States Army personnel of World War II
Military personnel from Pittsburgh
Lisp (programming language) people
Computer science educators
Taylor Allderdice High School alumni
Jewish American scientists